Baron Addington, of Addington in the County of Buckingham, is a title in the Peerage of the United Kingdom. It was created on 22 July 1887 for the businessman and Conservative Member of Parliament, John Hubbard. He was head of the firm of John Hubbard & Co and also sat as a Member of Parliament for Buckingham and the City of London. His eldest son, the second Baron, was a partner in the family firm and represented Buckingham in the House of Commons as a Conservative. He was succeeded by his eldest son, the third Baron. He was three times Mayor of Buckingham. On the death of his younger brother, the fourth Baron, the line of the eldest son of the first Baron failed. The title passed to their first cousin once removed, the fifth Baron. He was the grandson of Cecil John Hubbard, third son of the first Baron. , the title is held by his eldest son, the sixth Baron. He is one of the ninety elected hereditary peers that remain in the House of Lords after the passing of the House of Lords Act of 1999. Lord Addington sits on the Liberal Democrat benches.

Barons Addington (1887)
John Gellibrand Hubbard, 1st Baron Addington (1805–1889)
Egerton Hubbard, 2nd Baron Addington (1842–1915)
John Gellibrand Hubbard, 3rd Baron Addington (1883–1966)
Raymond Egerton Hubbard, 4th Baron Addington (1884–1971)
James Hubbard, 5th Baron Addington (1930–1982)
Dominic Bryce Hubbard, 6th Baron Addington (born 1963)

The heir presumptive is the present holder's younger brother, Michael Hubbard (born 1965).
The heir presumptive's heir apparent is his son, Oliver James Ononye Hubbard (born 2003).

Male-line family tree

Arms

Notes

References

Kidd, Charles, Williamson, David (editors). Debrett's Peerage and Baronetage (1990 edition). New York: St Martin's Press, 1990, 

Baronies in the Peerage of the United Kingdom
Noble titles created in 1887
Noble titles created for UK MPs